Stagecoach Group is a transport group based in Perth, Scotland. It operates buses, express coaches and a tram service in the United Kingdom.

History

Stagecoach was born out of deregulation of the British express coach market in the early 1980s, though its roots can be traced back to 1976 when Ann Gloag and her husband Robin Gloag set up a small recreational vehicle and minibus hire business called Gloagtrotter in Perth, Scotland. Ann's brother, Brian Souter, an accountant, joined the firm and expanded the business into bus hire. In 1982, with the collapse of his marriage to Ann, Robin Gloag sold his ownership stake in the business and ceased any involvement. The Transport Act 1980, which freed express services of 35 miles and over from regulation by the Traffic Commissioner, brought new opportunities for the company and services were launched from Dundee to London using second-hand Neoplan coaches. For a while, the company offered a very personal service with Brian Souter doing the driving and Ann Gloag making up sandwiches and snacks for the passengers.

Successfully competing against the then state-owned National Express Coaches and Scottish Citylink, the company grew significantly between 1981 and 1985, when Stagecoach entered local bus operation with the acquisition of McLennan of Spittalfield, near Perth. Its early success allowed Stagecoach to take advantage of the privatisation of the national bus groups. Several firms were purchased from London Regional Transport, the National Bus Company, Scottish Bus Group and various city councils. The company consolidated its operations during the 1990s by purchasing ex NBC and SBG bus companies that had been purchased via management buyouts and employee-owned corporations when privatised. Stagecoach left the long-distance express coach market in 1988 when it sold its operations to National Express.

During the privatisation of British Rail, Porterbrook was formed as one of three rolling stock companies owning around a third of passenger railway locomotives, multiple units and coaching stock running on Network Rail's system which is leased to various train operators. It was sold to a management buyout before being purchased by Stagecoach in August 1996. In April 2000 Stagecoach sold Porterbrook to Abbey National for £773 million.

In 1997, Stagecoach won the franchise to operate the Sheffield Supertram system, from the South Yorkshire Passenger Transport Executive, who own the system. Stagecoach bought the remaining 27 years of a 30-year franchise, which expires in 2024, and run the operation under the Stagecoach Supertram brand, having responsibility for the operation and maintenance of the tram system. When Stagecoach took over the system, it was struggling, both financially and in terms of attracting passengers, but it is now an extremely popular and successful operation. Stagecoach took another turn in 1998, when it purchased Scotland's Prestwick Airport for £41 million. By the summer of 1999, the company was rumoured to have been offered some £80 million for Prestwick. They sold the airport in January 2001 to concentrate on surface transport.

On 21 November 2005, Stagecoach announced the sale of its New Zealand operations to Infratil. On 14 December 2005 Stagecoach purchased Barnsley based Traction Group (Yorkshire Traction) for £26 million, and also assume Traction's £11 million debt. Traction operated 840 buses in South and West Yorkshire (Yorkshire Traction, Barnsley & District, Yorkshire Terrier), Lincolnshire (RoadCar) and Angus (Strathtay Scottish). Traction was the largest remaining privately owned independent bus operator in the UK.

Following the sale of its London bus operations to Macquarie Bank in 2006, Stagecoach UK Bus concentrated on the bus market outside the UK capital, focusing on organic growth and exploring acquisition options. In September 2005, following competition with its Megabus coach operation, Stagecoach launched a joint venture with Scottish Citylink coaches. After a competition enquiry, in October 2006 Stagecoach was instructed to sell some of the Scottish coach services. Stagecoach were also active in the rail industry, having a 49% stake in Virgin Rail Group. In 2007 the group were successful in their bid for the new East Midlands franchise which had been created by amalgamating the previous Midland Mainline franchise with the eastern part of the former Central Trains franchise.

In July 2007, Stagecoach commenced operating the Manchester Metrolink tram network. In January 2009, Stagecoach bought Preston Bus, a former rival in the Lancashire area. In November 2009 the Competition Commission ordered Stagecoach to sell Preston Bus after it had adversely affected competition in the area.

In October 2010, Stagecoach expanded further by re-acquiring East London and Selkent, Stagecoach's former London bus operations. In August 2011, Stagecoach sold its Manchester Metrolink concession to RATP Group halfway through its ten-year contract to operate the network. In December 2013, Stagecoach bought King's Lynn based Norfolk Green. In March 2015, Virgin Trains East Coast, in which Stagecoach held a 90% shareholding, commenced operating the InterCity East Coast franchise. The franchise was terminated on 23 June 2018 after it was revealed that Stagecoach had overbid.

In December 2018, it was announced that private equity house, Variant would acquire Stagecoach Group's US division for $271 million. The sale was completed in April 2019.

In April 2019, Stagecoach was disqualified from participating in three rail franchise competitions by the Department for Transport after it submitted non-compliant bids for the East Midlands, South Eastern and West Coast Partnership franchises.

A new set of liveries were introduced in February 2020 for British bus operations. Three colour schemes were to be used to reduce customer confusion:
 Local services- white with azure blue
 Longer distance - amber yellow
 Specialist services - white with ocean green (this includes park and ride, university and tourist services)

In September 2021, National Express entered into talks to acquire Stagecoach Group. In December 2021, a deal was agreed between the boards of the two companies: however, it was subject to both shareholder approval and regulatory scrutiny. To satisfy the Competition & Markets Authority, Stagecoach sold Megabus, its 35% shareholding in Scottish Citylink and the Falcon Coaches part of Stagecoach South West to ComfortDelGro. Having originally recommended shareholders accept the National Express offer, in March 2022 the board of directors withdrew the recommendation in favour of a takeover offer from a DWS managed investment fund.

In June 2022, Stagecoach purchased London bus operator Tower Transit's Lea Interchange garage, with Stagecoach London taking on 150 buses and 11 Transport for London bus route contracts; operations from Lea Interchange are managed under the Lea Interchange Bus Company Limited license. Later in August, Stagecoach acquired the London operations of the HCT Group after the company had fallen into administration, with Stagecoach acquiring a further 160 buses, 17 TfL route contracts and two bus garages from the acquisition.

Operations

Key people
Stagecoach Group plc was listed on the London Stock Exchange. Founder Brian Souter and his sister Ann Gloag were the largest shareholders with a combined 26% shareholding at April 2019.

UK operating companies
The following is a breakdown of the Stagecoach operating divisions. The centre of each operating region is shown in parentheses. Legal company names are listed alongside the trading names for that company.

Bus division
Bus division operations are as follows:

Brands

Apart from the ordinary bus operations and no-frills services, the UK bus division has the following brands that extend across operating divisions.
Stagecoach Express – an express coach service that operates mainly between towns and cities where Stagecoach operate. It tends not to compete with National Express like Megabus, and in some cases tickets are available through the National Express website.
Oxford Tube – an express coach service offering high frequency 24-hour services to London, operated by Stagecoach West.
Citi – some urban networks have received Citi branding, such as Cambridge, Exeter & Peterborough; although much of this brand has now been withdrawn.
Stagecoach Gold – a luxury bus service brand designed to attract middle class travellers to public transport, generally on the most important and high-profile routes within an area served by Stagecoach (e.g. Sheffield to Chesterfield). Gold buses typically feature a special blue and gold colour scheme, leather seats, and on-board Wi-Fi access.  Both single-decker and double-decker gold buses are used.
Stagecoach SimpliBus operates in the East Midlands.

Fleet numbers
The Stagecoach Group number their buses using a system that applies for the life of the bus or until it is sold, as follows:
10000 – 19999: double-decker buses
20000 – 29999: heavyweight single-decker buses
30000 – 39999: lightweight single-decker buses
40000 – 49999: minibuses and midibuses
50000 – 59999: coaches
60000 – 69999: New Routemasters and other specialised vehicles
70000 – 79999: series unused
80000 – 89999: demonstrator and loaned vehicles
90000 – 99999: pool cars, staff transport vehicles, etc.

Light Rail Division

Sheffield Supertram – Stagecoach has operated the Sheffield Supertram under a concession from the South Yorkshire Passenger Transport Executive since 1997. Its average daily ridership is 33,700, equalling more than 12 million per year, well above expectations. There are currently three light rail transit lines and a later tram-train service to Rotherham. Future plans included schemes to Dore, Fulwood and Maltby; following consultations, a reduced scheme with an extension to Broomhill was being considered.

Former operations

East Midlands Trains
East Midlands Trains – Stagecoach commenced operating this new franchise in November 2007 that took over all of Midland Mainline's and some of Central Trains services. It ceased operating in August 2019 when the franchise was taken over by Abellio East Midlands Railway.

Manchester Metrolink
In July 2007, Stagecoach took over the operation of Manchester Metrolink on a 10-year fixed-term management contract, beating competition from Keolis, Serco and Transdev, to make it the biggest tram operator in the UK. This system was the first modern tram system in the United Kingdom, opening just before the Sheffield system in 1992. Nearly 18 million people ride on the system a year. Stagecoach sold the Metrolink business to RATP Group in August 2011.

South West Trains
South West Trains – Stagecoach ran this franchise from February 1996 to August 2017. It retained the franchise for three years from February 2004 and for a further 10 years from February 2007. The franchise passed to First MTR South Western Railway on 20 August 2017
Island Line Trains – The rail system on the Isle of Wight, was also operated by Stagecoach from October 1996 to August 2017. In February 2007 it was merged into the South Western franchise.

Stagecoach Rail
In 1992, shortly before the privatisation of British Rail, Stagecoach Rail briefly operated a modest InterCity operation between Aberdeen and London. Two British Railways Mark 2 passenger carriages were re-branded in Stagecoach colours and attached to a scheduled British Rail InterCity sleeper service.

Virgin CrossCountry

Virgin Rail Group operated the CrossCountry franchise as Virgin CrossCountry from January 1997 until November 2007 when it passed to Arriva.

Virgin Trains East Coast
Virgin Trains East Coast, in which Stagecoach held a 90% shareholding, operated the InterCity East Coast franchise from March 2015 to June 2018.

Virgin Trains West Coast

Virgin Trains West Coast – the group has held a 49% stake in Virgin Rail Group since October 1998. Virgin Rail Group operated the InterCity West Coast franchise from March 1997 until December 2019.

Australia
In 1999, Stagecoach purchased the school bus operations of Sunbus in the Cairns, Ipswich and Sunshine Coast regions of Queensland. These were sold in 2002 to:
 Cairns: Love's Bus Service
 Ipswich: Pulitano Group
 Sunshine Coast: Buslink Queensland

Hong Kong

In 1994, Stagecoach created a bus-operating subsidiary in Hong Kong which operated residential bus services. It ceased operation in April 1996.

In 1999, Stagecoach planned to become the largest bus company in China through joint ventures, equity stakes and partnerships, and confirmed the £181 million acquisition of Hong Kong's Citybus. Stagecoach acquired control of Citybus Group, which provided franchised bus services on Hong Kong Island and to and from Hong Kong International Airport as well as non-franchised services throughout Hong Kong, in March 1999 and then completed the privatisation of Citybus on 17 July 1999.

In June 2003, the operation was sold to Chow Tai Fook Enterprises, the parent company of the major rival operator New World First Bus.

Kenya
In November 1991, Stagecoach Holdings (as it was named then), bought United Transport's shareholding in Kenya Bus Services. During its tenure, Stagecoach rapidly expanded the fleet, introducing the Express Services and the modern double decker buses back on Kenyan roads. In October 1998 a consortium of investors led by Karanja Kabage as chairman acquired Kenya Bus Services from Stagecoach Holdings which owned 95% of the business.

New Zealand

Stagecoach New Zealand was a wholly owned part of the Stagecoach Group, which provided bus services in Auckland, Wellington and the Hutt Valley and nine ferry routes in Auckland. It was the largest bus company in New Zealand when sold. Stagecoach NZ started operations when the firm acquired Wellington City Transport, including the Hutt Valley suburban bus operations of the New Zealand Railways Road Services, branded CityLine, in the 1990s. Following this initial acquisition Stagecoach also purchased Eastbourne Buses, The Yellow Bus Company in Auckland and a controlling interest in Fullers Auckland. In November 2005, the business was sold to Infratil and rebranded as NZ Bus.

North America
Stagecoach carried out bus operations in the northeastern and midwestern United States and in eastern Canada. Businesses were focused on commuter services, and included tour and charter, sightseeing, local, and school bus operations:
Coach USA – operating primarily in the northeastern United States providing subsidised transit services (primarily in Greater New York), sightseeing, and charter services, and in the midwestern United States with primarily charter and sightseeing services. Yellow school bus services are also provided by Coach USA in the state of Wisconsin.
Megabus – discount express bus services radiating from Chicago and New York City. Like Megabus in the United Kingdom, most stops are made at street locations.
Coach Canada – serving primarily Ontario and Quebec, where it operates interurban and chartered bus services, contract bus services in Durham, yellow school bus service in Durham Region and Peterborough County in Ontario, and sightseeing services in Montreal.

In December 2018, Stagecoach announced it had agreed to sell all of its North American operations to Variant Equity Advisors with the deal concluded in April 2019.

Portugal
Stagecoach Portugal had its origins in the re-privatisation of Portuguese bus and coach operation, which had been nationalised after the 1974 Revolution. In 1990, the nationalised Rodoviária Nacional was split into ten components. In the capital, Lisbon, Rodoviária de Lisboa was the chief operator outside the city itself, where Carris provided city bus and tram services. The name of Rodoviária de Lisboa survived as part of the Barraqueiro bus company, but another part, serving the area to the west of Lisbon, became Stagecoach Portugal in 1995. A further portion still operates as Vimeca – Viação Mecânica de Carnaxide. In June 2001, Stagecoach announced the sale of their Portuguese operations to ScottURB for £14 million.

Nordic countries
In October 1996, during Stagecoach's International buying spree, it made its most important international acquisition at the time, buying Swebus AB, the bus-company arm of the Swedish State Railways (SJ), for 1.2 billion kronor ($164 million), which also included operations in Denmark, Finland and Norway. The operations in Norway included only city and regional traffic in three minor cities around lake Mjøsa, but several unsuccessful bids on operators in the Oslo area led to Stagecoach selling out to Norgesbuss in April 1997. The Danish operations never proved profitable, and were sold to Combus in autumn of 1997. The operations in Finland were more successful, and were in April 1998 renamed Stagecoach Finland. In spring of 1997, Swebus Express was started as an intercity coach service between several cities in southern parts of Sweden, sporting the Stagecoach livery of the time. Stagecoach in 1998 announced that it had bid for several rail franchises in Sweden. On 27 October 1999, Stagecoach revealed that it was going to sell Swebus to Concordia Bus for £100 million, to refocus its bus operation on the United States and Asia.

No-frills brands
Stagecoach operate a number of so-called "no-frills" services across the United Kingdom and the United States. Applying the business model of the low-cost carrier air lines, these services aim to offer cheaper alternatives to the established operators in the bus, coach and rail markets, by reducing costs, and offering extremely low fares for the earliest bookings, rising nearer the journey time:

Magic Bus

Magic Bus was the first no-frills brand of Stagecoach. It was first used in red lettering on ex London Regional Transport AEC Routemasters, otherwise painted in Stagecoach stripes, in competition in Glasgow. Later, an allover blue with yellow lettering was adopted, on older service buses with simple fares and no travel passes, usually operated on routes with strong competition from other operators, most notably on the Manchester Piccadilly to East Didsbury Wilmslow Road bus corridor route in Manchester, but also in Newcastle upon Tyne and East Scotland (as Magic Mini). In 2008 Stagecoach Merseyside introduced a Magic Bus service competing with themselves and Arriva North West on the busy route 14 corridor, Magic Bus 14C runs every 7/8 minutes between City Centre and Broadway. By 2012, only the Manchester Magic Bus remained, these being upgraded from Volvo Olympians and Dennis Dragons to Alexander ALX400 and East Lancs bodied Dennis Trident 2s.

Megabus

Megabus is a low cost, "no-frills" intercity coach service launched in the United Kingdom by Stagecoach in 2003, on 10 April 2006 in the United States, and in 2009 within Canada. Its main rival in the UK is National Express, who have had to lower their prices to compete with Megabus. In the US, Megabus/Eastern Shuttle's main rival is BoltBus, which is 50% owned by Stagecoach rival FirstGroup. In the UK, the Megabus network covers most of the island of Great Britain, although some routes offer only one journey per day. Originally operated using high capacity, but older coach-seated vehicles, most services are now operated with new modern single or double deck coaches. In the United States, services radiate from Chicago and New York City, but the networks are not connected. In both the UK and the US, to cut costs, most services use on-street bus stops, rather than pay for access to coach stations (except in cases where pre-existing routes were converted to Megabus lines). A notable exception to this is the use of London Victoria Coach Station.

Megatrain

On 14 November 2005, the Megabus concept was extended to certain rail services, with the introduction of Megatrain between London and Southampton, and London and Portsmouth, using a dedicated carriage on selected South West Trains services. It was later extended to some Virgin Trains services (since withdrawn) and to selected East Midlands Trains services. In 2009, the Megabusplus concept was introduced, under which certain trips are begun on a train and are then completed on a bus. Unlike the original Megatrain concept, this service is available seven days a week.

Scottish Citylink

In September 2005, Stagecoach and ComfortDelGro announced a joint venture in the provision of express coach services in Scotland, ending intense competition between ComfortDelGro's subsidiary Scottish Citylink and Stagecoach subsidiaries Megabus and Motorvator. Under the terms of the joint venture, the Stagecoach Group acquires a 35% stake in Scottish Citylink Coaches Ltd, with Citylink assuming certain rights to the Megabus and Motorvator brands in Scotland.

The Competition Commission ruled in October 2006 that the joint venture substantially reduced competition and that evidence suggested some routes were already experiencing higher fares as a result. Though no firm conclusion was drawn, regulators are to consult the two companies about what they need to do to comply with competition regulations and they have indicated that this will likely lead to the forced divestment of some services to an independent operator. The ruling was criticised by Stagecoach as leaving vital services in limbo and jeopardising Scotland's intercity coach network, making it unable to compete effectively with rail and private car journeys.

To satisfy the commission, some Citylink routes were sold to Parks Motor Group in early 2008.

Controversy

Competitive strategy
Following the deregulation of bus services in the United Kingdom, Stagecoach bought a number of the newly emerged small bus companies and ran free or low fare buses to put local rivals out of business. In Darlington, Stagecoach subsidiary Busways offered bounties to recruit drivers away from the existing bus service and offered free buses to deter the rival preferred bidder from taking over the existing bus service. This was "predatory, deplorable and against the public interest" according to findings from the Monopolies & Mergers Commission.

In 2000, Stagecoach Manchester was found to have been employing bus inspectors to usher passengers away from competitor's services. In 2005 alleged aggressive behaviour by Stagecoach drivers, seeking to compete with Scotbus, resulted in an arson fire at a Stagecoach East Scotland garage.

In 2006/07, Stagecoach Manchester and UK North engaged in a bus war on route 192 and on the Wilmslow Road bus corridor that caused traffic chaos in Manchester. In November 2009 the Competition Commission ordered Stagecoach to sell Preston Bus after it had adversely affected competition in the area. Preston Bus was sold in January 2011.

Controversial chairman
The Stagecoach Group has also indirectly attracted criticism through controversial statements and actions made by its chairman and co-founder, Brian Souter, regarding certain public statements and his funding of a campaign to block the repeal of the Section 28 law. In 2000, OutRage! spokesman Peter Tatchell, called for a boycott of the bus and rail group.

Guided Busway
Stagecoach operate buses along the Cambridgeshire Guided Busway. The Guide wheels on the side of the buses, combined with a specially built track mean that hands free driving is possible. The main advantages of a guided busway, versus a normal road are higher speeds (meaning increased capacity) and increased safety as traffic of differing directions is physically separated.

See also
 Bus transport in the United Kingdom

References

Further reading

External links
Company website

Stagecoach Group
Bus groups in the United Kingdom
Companies formerly listed on the London Stock Exchange
Scottish brands
Transport companies established in 1980
1980 establishments in Scotland